Paschalis Kassos (born 7 November 1991) is a Greek professional footballer who plays as a winger for Super League 2 club Niki Volos.

Career

Doxa Drama
Kassos signed for Doxa Drama in 2011 and was loaned out to Prosotsani to get playing time. He debuted for Doxa Drama on 9 December 2012 in a home win against Ethnikos Gazoros. Kassos managed to score his first goal for the club on 15 May 2013 in a home draw against Fokikos. Totally in his two years with Doxa he appeared in 45 matches and scored 7 goals.

Iraklis
On 19 August 2014 Kassos signed for Football League club Iraklis.

Aris
On 27 July 2017 he joined Aris. On 28 October 2017 he scored his first goal for the club in a 5-0 home win against Aiginiakos. On 12 March he scored in a 3-0 home win against Ergotelis.

AEL
On 4 June 2018, he joined AEL on a three-year contract.

References

External links
Myplayer.gr profile

1991 births
Living people
Greek footballers
Association football wingers
Delta Ethniki players
Football League (Greece) players
Super League Greece players
Super League Greece 2 players
Doxa Drama F.C. players
Iraklis Thessaloniki F.C. players
Apollon Smyrnis F.C. players
Aris Thessaloniki F.C. players
AO Chania F.C. players
Niki Volos F.C. players
Footballers from Drama, Greece